Julio Eduardo Ostos (born 10 December 1953) is a Venezuelan chess International Master (IM) (1978) and five-time Venezuelan Chess Championship winner (1974, 1980, 1985, 1987, 2000).

Biography
From the mid-1970s to the end of the 2000s, Ostos was one of Venezuela's leading chess players. He won the Venezuelan Chess Championship five times: 1974, 1980, 1985, 1987, and 2000. Ostos participated in the Pan American Chess Championship three times: 1988, 2007, and 2010.

Ostos played for Venezuela in the Chess Olympiads:
 In 1976, at first board in the 22nd Chess Olympiad in Haifa (+1, =5, −3),
 In 1978, at first board in the 23rd Chess Olympiad in Buenos Aires (+7, =4, −3),
 In 1980, at first board in the 24th Chess Olympiad in La Valletta (+4, =5, −3),
 In 1982, at third board in the 25th Chess Olympiad in Lucerne (+6, =3, −4),
 In 1988, at first board in the 28th Chess Olympiad in Thessaloniki (+4, =3, −5),
 In 1990, at first board in the 29th Chess Olympiad in Novi Sad (+4, =1, −5),
 In 1996, at first board in the 32nd Chess Olympiad in Yerevan (+5, =1, −6),
 In 2000, at first reserve board in the 34th Chess Olympiad in Istanbul (+3, =2, −2),
 In 2002, at first reserve board in the 35th Chess Olympiad in Bled (+4, =2, −2),
 In 2004, at third board in the 36th Chess Olympiad in Calvià (+3, =0, −5),
 In 2006, at first reserve board in the 37th Chess Olympiad in Turin (+2, =1, −3),
 In 2012, at fourth board in the 40th Chess Olympiad in Istanbul (+2, =3, −3).

Ostos played for Venezuela in the World Student Team Chess Championships:
 In 1976, at first board in the 21st World Student Team Chess Championship in Caracas (+4, =1, −6),
 In 1977, at second board in the 22nd World Student Team Chess Championship in Mexico City (+9, =1, −2).

Ostos played for Venezuela in the Pan American Team Chess Championships:
 In 2000, at second board in the 6th Panamerican Team Chess Championship in Mérida (+2, =0, −2) and won individual bronze medal.

In 1978, Ostos was awarded the FIDE International Master (IM) title.

References

External links

Julio Ostos chess games at 365chess.com

1953 births
Living people
Venezuelan chess players
Chess International Masters
Chess Olympiad competitors
20th-century chess players